Dream is the fourth album by the duo Captain & Tennille and their final album with A&M Records.

Recording studios
The album was recorded at A&M Recording Studios (Hollywood, California) 1977; A&M Recording Studios "A"  1977; Rumbo Recorders (Captain & Tennille's Private Studio), (San Fernando Valley) 1977; The Record Plant (Los Angeles) 1977; Wally Heider Recording (Hollywood, California) 1977.

After their last two singles released from their prior album failed to enter the Billboard Top 40, two singles released from this album returned them to the Top 40. "You Need a Woman Tonight" peaked at #40, and "You've Never Done It Like That" took them back to the Top 10, peaking at #10.

Record World said of "You Never Done It Like That" that "Toni Tennille's semi -sexy vocals are highlighted, driven along nicely by a heavy pop bass line."  Record World said that "You Need a Woman Tonight" "has a slight Caribbean beat and is sparked by Toni Tennille's compelling phrasing and the Captain's keyboards."

Track listing

Side one
 "I'm on My Way" (Mark Safan) (2:49)
 "You Never Done It Like That" (Howard Greenfield - Neil Sedaka) (3:19)
 "Dixie Hummingbird" (Ray Stevens) (3:59)
 "You Need a Woman Tonight" (Dana Merino) (3:14)
 "Love Me Like a Baby" (Howard Greenfield - Toni Tennille) (3:35)
 "Love Is Spreading over the World" (Howard Greenfield - Neil Sedaka) (4:02)

Side two
 ""D" Keyboard Blues" (Daryl Dragon) (4:00)
 "Good Enough" (John Hall - Johanna Hall)  (4:00)
 "If There Were Time" (Bruce Johnston - Rod McKuen) (3:51)
 "Back to the Island" (Leon Russell) (4:33)
 "Dream" (John Mercer) (3:25)

Charts

Singles

"I'm on My Way" also reached #97 on the U.S. Billboard Hot Country Songs chart; and "You Never Done It Like That" also reached #63 on the UK Singles Chart and #51 in Australia.

Critical reception
Dream was released in 1978 on A&M records, and included the hit singles "You Never Done It Like That" and "You Need a Woman Tonight". The album was recorded throughout their own studio (Captain & Tennille's private studio). Title track marked the conclusion of a 1940s standards show. "You Never Done It Like That" was originally recorded by Sedaka on his album A Song.

Personnel
 Piano, lead and background vocals - Toni Tennille
 Drums, congas - Michael E. Mathis, Hal Blaine, Ron Tutt, Shelly Manne
 Bass guitar, keyboards, electric guitar, tambourine, percussion - Daryl "Captain" Dragon
 Backing vocals - Carolyn Willis, Melissa Tennille, Gene Merlino, Louisa Tennille, Gary Sims, Gene Morford, Ron Hicklin, Bruce Johnston
 Photography - Norman Seeff

References

External links
Discogs
Allmusic

1978 albums
A&M Records albums
Captain & Tennille albums
Albums recorded at Wally Heider Studios
Albums recorded at A&M Studios